Circus World was a theme park built north of Haines City, Florida in Polk County, on the south-east corner of the Interstate 4-US 27 interchange.  It was originally a property of the Ringling Bros. and Barnum & Bailey Circus Combined Shows Inc., and was intended additionally to be the circus's winter headquarters as well as to have the Ringling Bros. and Barnum & Bailey Clown College and its museum located there.

History
Circus World plans, which did not change by opening, were announced by Irvin Feld as a project of Ringling Bros. and Barnum & Bailey Circus, in September 1972. Plans included a 19 story elephant-shaped hotel and Barnum City, a state-of-the-art residential community. These items and some of the other items were never built, but the plans did not change until after Mattel sold the park.

Circus World Showcase, its preview center, had its groundbreaking on April 26, 1973 with building contractor Mercury Construction Company of Haines City. The showcase was due to open in December 1973 when Mattel placed Ringling Bros. and Barnum & Bailey Circus Combined Shows Inc., including the park, up for sale. Venture Out in America, Inc., a Gulf Oil recreational subsidiary, agreed to buy the combined shows in January 1974, and the opening was further pushed back to 1975. Early added rides included the Zoomerang (June 1977) and the Hurricane (1978). Attendance peaked in 1979 at 1.3 million. In 1980, the theme park made a profit.

Mattel sold the circus back to its previous owner, Irvin Feld and other parties in 1982, but kept the park, further expanding it with shows, rides, and a new roller coaster.

Attendance had declined for five straight years when Mattel agreed to sell the park to Jim Monaghan in 1983.  The sale was finalized in 1984. Monaghan nicknamed the park Thrill City USA and made his objective to have the park be a world-class theme park. He added nine major European-built thrill rides and six youth rides.

According to Funways Holidays, Circus World developed a big problem with the opening of Walt Disney World's Epcot Center in late 1982. With most tourists taking a full four days visiting Central Florida, Disney World added Epcot to its passes, resulting in three days being filled, thus tourists usually only had one day to visit other venues and usually selected Sea World, Busch Gardens and/or Wet 'n Wild over Circus World.

In February 1985, Circus World started putting vintage objects and exhibits up for auction with Guernsey`s auction house, including a 1921 original Marcus Illions Coney Island carousel and Gargantua II. These items did not add to the park's draw of attendees per Monaghan. The park made a profit in 1985.

Monaghan sold the park for stock to Harcourt Brace Jovanovich (now Harcourt, a division of Reed Elsevier) on May 10, 1986. Harcourt Brace Jovanovich, which had just bought several parks including the SeaWorld parks and Cypress Gardens, had a new idea for the area and closed the park at opening time that day to rebuild it into Boardwalk and Baseball. Circus World was never successful, as its standard carnival-type rides were no match for Disney's state-of-the-art attractions, and its location was out of the way relative to Disney World.

Under Mattel, then some under Monaghan, Funways Holidays also noted the park attendance was hurt by lagging in cleanliness, value and food. Also, constant staff turnover, ticket discounting, marketing errors and swift policy changes were issues.

Attractions

Circus World Showcase, The preview center for Circus World Showcase, as it was originally called, a  building designed to look like a circus tent, was erected and opened in 1974. The building featured, among other things, an IMAX and regular movie theater. Exhibits were built around it throughout the next two years, including a carousel, a Ferris wheel, a classic wooden roller coaster, several shows, and an interactive experience where visitors could actually attempt certain daredevil stunts such as tightrope walking and the trapeze (with copious safety equipment and expert help). A 1000+ seat arena was also built featuring daily circus performances that included live tiger, elephant, equestrian, trapeze and acrobatic acts, as well as clowns and a live band. The Showcase part was eventually dropped, making the park "Circus World". Other live shows were added including a wild West rodeo that performed daily in a customized outdoor rodeo arena.
James A. Bailey Theatre, an IMAX theater
Carousel
Elephants performances 
Elephant rides
Camel rides
 Center Ring
 The Hurricane (1978) also Florida Hurricane, a main attraction at the park, this was a wooden coaster and was used at Boardwalk and Baseball
 Wiener Looping (1984) Manufactured by Shwarzhopf of West Germany 
Starting with a nose-bleed, 150-feet climb backward up a flagpole, the coaster then zips down into a series of shoulder- crunching turns and then a neck-twisting full loop. Ah, a temporary reprieve. Then, a forward ascent up the same pole with a trip backward through the same route shortly thereafter. I mean shortly thereafter. The trip backward is more frightening because passengers can`t see the twists and turns ahead.
 The Ranger, ship-like swing ride that rotates
 Music Express, backward traveling carts over a hilly circle a few times while playing loud disco music
 The Schlittenfahren (German: sleigh-riding) sleigh-shaped carts that are trackless and suspended from above. The sleigh seems to travel over water speedily in an oval.
 The Para Tower, a three-person gondola drops along tower with a parachute and is for small children
 The Wave Swinger, riders, designed for kids, sit in wicker chairs suspended a hub and spin until forces pushes them outward.
 Roaring Tiger coaster
 Great Western Stampede show
 Barnum City Depot
 flaming high diver
 flame eaters
 polar bears show
 Wonderful World of Clowns location with show and "Be a Clown"
 midway (fair)
 tightrope walking
 Be a Star circus show, with attendee participation as they can try the flying trapeze in a safety harness

References

External links
Circus World at Florida's Lost Tourist Attractions (source of information for this article)
History of Amusement Parks: Circus World

Defunct amusement parks in Florida
Defunct IMAX venues
Ringling Bros. and Barnum & Bailey Circus
History of Polk County, Florida
1974 establishments in Florida
1986 disestablishments in Florida
Amusement parks opened in 1974
Amusement parks closed in 1986